Johann Adolf Schlegel (17 September 1721 – 16 September 1793) was a German poet and clergyman.

Biography
Schlegel was born in Meißen, Saxony, and was the brother of Johann Elias Schlegel. After finishing his studies in Leipzig, he became a deacon and teacher at Pforta in 1751. In 1754, he became a pastor and professor in Zerbst, before moving to become a pastor in Hannover at the Marktkirche in 1759. He rose to the consistory of the Hanoverian Lutheran Church and the deanship at the Neustädter Kirche in 1775, dying in Hanover in 1793.

His sons August Wilhelm Schlegel and Friedrich Schlegel were influential early members of the Romantic movement.

He was a noted contributor to the Bremer Beiträge, a literary journal popular at the time. Despite his active work in literary circles, only one hymn has survived to the present day out of all his poetry and musical works. He also published a commentary on Charles Batteux's Les beaux-arts réduits à un même principe, translating it into German.

Schlegel died in Hanover, Brunswick-Lüneburg.

References

External links
Literature by or about Schlegel, from the Deutschen Nationalbibliothek (German)
German Biographical Entry on Schlegel (German)

1721 births
1793 deaths
18th-century German Lutheran clergy
German poets
People from Meissen
People from the Electorate of Saxony
Leipzig University alumni
German male poets